Brownstown is a village in County Kildare, Ireland, south of The Curragh and east of Kildare Town. It is situated on the road from Athy to Newbridge closed to the village of Cutbush. Spanning the townlands of Brownstown Lower and Brownstown Great, it is located in the historical barony of Offaly East and the civil parish of Carn. As of the 2016 census, the Central Statistics Office recorded Brownstown as having a population of 883 people.

See also
List of towns and villages in Ireland

References

Towns and villages in County Kildare